Erimli is a town (belde) in Arıcak District, Elazığ Province, Turkey. Its population is 2,515 (2021).

References

Towns in Turkey
Populated places in Elazığ Province
Arıcak District